Hoglapasha Union is a Union Parishad under Morrelganj Upazila of Bagerhat District in the division of Khulna, Bangladesh. It has an area of 44.03 km2 (17.00 sq mi) and a population of 18,939.

References

Unions of Morrelganj Upazila
Unions of Bagerhat District
Unions of Khulna Division